Jump Smokers were an electro house music group from the United States. The band consisted of members Justin Roman (vocals/lyrics) and Flipside (production/DJ).

Background 
The two met in Chicago, Illinois working for Chicago radio station B96 in 2003. They formed the group in 2009 along with producer Reydon and digital media designer Johnny Digital. Their debut album, Kings of the Dancefloor!, was released July 27, 2010 on Ultra Records. In 2012, Reydon moved on from the group and Marquee joined the group for 2 years.

Career 
In 2009, Jump Smokers featured on Honorebel's hit single "Now You See It (Shake That Ass)" alongside American rapper Pitbull. They later released their debut single in November titled "Don't Be a Douchebag". They released their debut studio album on 27 July 2010 via Ultra Records.

The band would go on to produce over a dozen remixes for various songs by Pitbull up until the band went defunct in 2016.

Controversy 
In 2009, they released "My Flow So Tight", a song criticizing Chris Brown for his altercation against Rihanna. The song gained radio airplay in cities across the country. A portion of the proceeds benefited various organizations for battered women.

Discography

References

American DJs
American musical trios
American house music groups
Musical groups from Chicago
Musical groups established in 2009
Electronic dance music DJs
Remixers